Elaine Sandra-Lee Thompson-Herah OD (née Thompson; born June 28, 1992) is a Jamaican sprinter who competes in the 60 metres, 100 metres and 200 metres. Regarded as one of the greatest sprinters of all time, she is a five-time Olympic champion, the fastest woman alive over the 100 m, and the third-fastest ever over 200 m.

Thompson-Herah is the first female sprinter in history, and the second sprinter after Usain Bolt, to win the "sprint double" at consecutive Olympics, capturing 100 m and 200 m gold at the 2016 Rio Olympics and again at the 2020 Tokyo Olympics. A six-time Olympic medallist, she rose to prominence at the 2015 World Athletics Championships, winning a silver in the 200 m. At the Rio Olympics, she became the first woman since Florence Griffith-Joyner in 1988 to win 100 m and 200 m gold at the Olympics.

After the Rio Olympics, Thompson-Herah was plagued by an Achilles Tendon injury, which affected her performance at the 2017 World Athletics Championships and the 2019 World Athletics Championships. However, she returned to the top of athletics at the Tokyo Olympics, retaining her 100 m title in a new Olympic record of 10.61 seconds, and her 200 m title in a new personal best and national record of 21.53 s. After winning a third gold medal in the 4 × 100 m relay, she became the third sprinter after Griffith-Joyner and Bolt to complete an Olympic sprinting triple.

In her first post-Tokyo Olympic race she set another 100 m personal best, Jamaican and Diamond League record of 10.54 s, becoming the first woman to break the 40 km/h barrier, then ran times of 10.64 s and 10.65 s. For her season she was voted Laureus Sportswoman of the Year, and World Athletics World Female Athlete of the Year. One of the most dominant sprinters in the world, she is the 100 m 2019 Pan American Games champion and a three-time Diamond League winner.  In 2022, retired American sprinter Michael Johnson called Thompson-Herah and her compatriot Shelly-Ann Fraser-Pryce the two greatest female sprinters of all time.

Early life
Thompson is a native of Banana Ground in Manchester Parish, Jamaica. Running for Christiana High School and later Manchester High School, she was a good but not outstanding scholastic sprinter; her best result at the Jamaican ISSA Grace Kennedy Boys and Girls Championships came in 2009, when she placed fourth in the Class Two 100 metres in 12.01 seconds. In 2011, her final year at Manchester High, she was left off the track team for disciplinary reasons.

Athletics career
After high school, Thompson was recruited to the University of Technology, Jamaica by Paul Francis, brother of MVP Track Club head coach Stephen Francis. With MVP coaching, her times started improving steadily.

In 2013, she clocked a seasonal best of 11.41s at the Gibson Replays and placed second behind Carrie Russell at the Jamaican Intercollegiate Championships. At the Central American and Caribbean Championships in Morelia, she won gold in the 4 × 100 metres relay, running the first leg on the Jamaican team as it won in 43.58s.

In 2014, Thompson won her first intercollegiate title, placed fifth in 11.26 s at the national championships, and had a seasonal best of 11.17 s. She represented Jamaica at the Commonwealth Games in Glasgow, running in the 4 × 100 metres relay heats; Jamaica won their heat in 42.44 s, and went on to win gold in the final with Thompson-Herah not in the line-up.

2015
Thompson made her international breakthrough in 2015. She repeated as Jamaican intercollegiate champion in March and broke 11 seconds for the first time at the UTech Classic on 11 April, running a world-leading 10.92 s. She ran 10.97 s at the Jamaica International Invitational in Kingston, defeating a field that included Blessing Okagbare and Allyson Felix. At the Pre Classic in Eugene, she was narrowly beaten by English Gardner in the B-race as both were timed in 10.84 s; as of 27 July 2015, this was Thompson's personal best in the 100m and ranked her 30th on the world all-time list.

She was expected to run the 100 metres at the Jamaican National Championships, which doubled as trials for the 2015 World Championships in Beijing; however, her coach Stephen Francis pulled her from that event and instead had her concentrate on the 200 metres, in which she had set a personal best of 22.37 s in May. The move generated controversy in Jamaica; Francis stated that Thompson was not ready to double and that she had been prepared for the 200 m in which her main weakness, the start, would not play as large a role. She won the national 200m title in 22.51s, qualifying for the World Championships.

At the London Grand Prix on 25 July, Thompson won a non-scoring Diamond League 200 m race in 22.10 s, defeating Americans Tori Bowie and Candyce McGrone; the time was her new personal best and broke Merlene Ottey's meeting record from 1991.

At the Beijing World Championships, she won a silver medal, just 0.03 s behind Dafne Schippers of Netherlands. Thompson's time of 21.66 s was faster than the previous championships record but 0.03s slower than Schippers. Fellow Jamaican Veronica Campbell Brown was third in 21.97 s.

2016
Thompson kicked off her season indoors running multiple 60m races. At the 2016 IAAF World Indoor Championships she would go on to win a bronze medal in the 60m final. She would end her indoor season with a 60m personal best of 7.04 seconds.

On 1 July, she set a personal best in the 100 m with a time of 10.70 s (tying the Jamaican national record held by Shelly-Ann Fraser-Pryce) winning the event at the Jamaican Championships. She did not advance to the semifinals in the 200 m running only a 23.34 s. However, Thompson was given a medical exemption in the 200m which gave her the opportunity to chase the double in Rio.

In the 100m final of the 2016 Olympic Games in Rio de Janeiro, Thompson won the gold medal with a time of 10.71 s, ahead of Tori Bowie (10.83 s), and the 2008 Beijing Olympics and 2012 London Olympics winner, fellow Jamaican, Shelly-Ann Fraser-Pryce (10.86 s).

In the 200m final, she won her second gold, clocking 21.78 s; Dafne Schippers placed second in 21.88 s and Tori Bowie third in 22.15 s.

She was the first female Jamaican sprinter to win the 100 m and 200 m at one Olympic Games and the seventh overall. She also ran in the national  relay team which placed second, thus leaving Rio de Janeiro with three medals.

In this season, Thompson took her first Diamond League title (100 m) winning four 100 m races, one 200 m race and also a relay race.

2017–2019
On the 18th February, Thompson lined up for the 60m at Birmingham Indoor Grand Prix, the final meeting in the 2017 IAAF World Indoor Tour. She would go on to run a personal best of 6.98s making her at the time the tied 7th fastest woman over 60 metres and at the time one of eight to break the 7 second barrier over the distance

In April, Thompson was in the team which won a gold medal in the 4 × 200 metres relay at the World Relays, setting competition and national record with a time of 1m 29.04s.

In mid-2017, Thompson developed a recurring Achilles Tendon injury that affected her training and performances.

She competed in the 100 m at the 2017 London World Championships, placing fifth with at time of 10.98 s. In 2017, she became, for the second time, 100 m Diamond League champion winning six 100 m races, one 200 m race, and also a relay race.

In 2018 Thompson would go on to compete in the 2018 IAAF World Indoor Championships where she would finish fourth in the 60m final with a time of 7.08s. In the semifinals she would set a season’s best of 7.07s.

Later on in the year Thompson would represent Jamaica at the 2018 Commonwealth Games where she would finish fourth in the  200m with a time of 22.30s. She would come back for the 4x100 meters relay final where she would get a silver medal in a time of 42.52 seconds.

The following year, Thompson would be a part of Jamaica’s team at the 2019 IAAF World Relays where she received  a bronze medal in the 4 × 200 metres relay after running a time of 1:33.21 seconds.

She would then go on to race at the 2019 Pan American Games where she won gold over the 100 meters with a time of 11.17 seconds.

At the 2019 World Championships in Doha, she finished fourth in the 100 m running 10.93 s. Thompson-Herah achieved a time of 22.61 s in the 200 m heats, qualifying for the semifinals, but she did not start due to her Achilles tendon injury.

2020
In 2020, Thompson-Herah ran seven 100m races and achieved times under 11 seconds in five of them, with a season-best of 10.85 s (10.73s with illegal wind). She won two Diamond League meets which were staged as one-off events due to the COVID-19 pandemic. In the 200m, her season best was 22.19 s.

2021
In June, at the Jamaican Championships, she placed third in both her disciplines, with times of 10.84 s and 22.02 s respectively, qualifying in the both events for the delayed 2020 Tokyo Olympics. On 6 July, she achieved a time of 10.71 s in the 100 m to defeat Fraser-Pryce and win the Continental Tour's Székesfehérvár Memorial in Hungary with a meet record. It was her fastest time since 2017, and just 0.01 s off her personal best.

At the Tokyo Games, 29-year-old Thompson-Herah placed first in the women's 100 metres final, winning a gold medal as fellow Jamaican athletes Shelly-Ann Fraser-Pryce and Shericka Jackson received silver and bronze medals, respectively. Running into an 0.6 m/s headwind, she achieved the joint second-fastest time in history of 10.61 seconds, setting both the Jamaican record and the Olympic record, breaking Florence Griffith Joyner's mark of 10.62 s set at the 1988 Seoul Olympics. Thompson-Herah ran a top speed of 39.7 km/h, the fastest speed ever achieved by a female sprinter. The previous top speed was from Griffith-Joyner who reached 39.1 km/h in 1988. Competing at her longer distance, she first equalled her personal best of 21.66 s in the semifinals. In the final, she won the gold medal with a new lifetime best of 21.53 seconds, also the then-second-fastest result in history. In addition, she was a part of 4 x 100 m relay team which won the competition in the third-fastest ever time and a new national record to regain a title last won by Jamaica at the 2004 Athens Games.

In her first post-Olympic race on 21 August, competing at the Prefontaine Classic in Eugene, Thompson-Herah stormed to the 100 m victory with a new career best of 10.54 seconds, the second-fastest time in women's history and only 0.05 s off the world record. She became the first woman to break the 40 km/h barrier. At the Lausanne Athletissima meet, she placed second in the event in 10.64 s, behind Fraser-Pryce who powered to her new lifetime best of 10.60 s, recording however, the fastest runner-up time in history. She concluded her very successful season with wins, refreshing meet records at both the Meeting de Paris and Weltklasse Zürich Diamond League's final with times of 10.72 s and 10.65 s respectively to take her third Diamond Trophy.

As of the end of the season, Thompson-Herah held four records in the all-time top 10 marks women's statistics. She was the first woman to hold more than three marks in the 100 m (four), and the first woman to hold more than two marks in the 200 m (three). She was also the first woman to run more than three legal times under 10.70 seconds (four), and the first woman to achieve more than two legal times under 21.70 seconds (three), respectively.

For her history-making season, Thompson-Herah received World Athletics' World Female Athlete of the Year award, was named Best Female Athlete of the Year by the International Sports Press Association (529 journalists from 114 countries), Female Athlete of the Year by the North American, Central American and Caribbean Athletic Association, Athlete of the Year by Track & Field News, and Jamaican Person of the Year by the Best of Jamaica, among many other accolades.

Personal life
Thompson is married to former sprinter and coach Derron Herah.

Achievements

Personal bests

Progression
As of April 2022, Thompson-Herah has achieved 48 finishes under 11 seconds in the 100 metres.

International competitions

Circuit wins and titles
  Diamond League winner (100m): 2016
  Diamond League champion (100m): 2017
  Diamond League champion (100m): 2021
 2015 (2): London (200m), Zürich 4 × 100m relay)
 2016 (6): Rabat (100m), Rome (100m), Lausanne (100m), Zürich (200m & 4 × 100m relay), Brussels (100m)
 2017 (8): Doha (200m), Shanghai (100m), Paris (100m), London (100m), Rabat (100m), Birmingham (100m), Zürich 4 × 100m relay), Brussels (100m)
 2019 (4): Rome (100m), London (200m & 4 × 100m relay), Paris (100m)
 2020 (2): Rome (100m), Doha (100m)
 2021 (4): London Grand Prix in Gateshead (200m), Eugene (100m   NR), Paris (100m MR), Zürich (100m MR)
 2022 (2): Eugene (100m), Rabat (100m MR)
 World Indoor Tour (60m)
 2017: Birmingham
 2019: Birmingham
 2022: Birmingham

National titles
 Jamaican Championships
 100 metres (4): 2016, 2017, 2018, 2019
 200 metres (2): 2015, 2019

See also
 List of Olympic medalists in athletics (women)
 List of World Athletics Championships medalists (women)
 100 metres
 200 metres
 2019 in 100 metres
 2020 in 100 metres

Notes

References

External links

 
 2017 Interview at World Athletics

1992 births
Living people
People from Manchester Parish
Jamaican female sprinters
Athletes (track and field) at the 2014 Commonwealth Games
Athletes (track and field) at the 2018 Commonwealth Games
World Athletics Championships athletes for Jamaica
World Athletics Championships medalists
World Athletics Indoor Championships medalists
Athletes (track and field) at the 2016 Summer Olympics
Olympic athletes of Jamaica
Olympic gold medalists for Jamaica
Olympic silver medalists for Jamaica
Medalists at the 2016 Summer Olympics
Olympic gold medalists in athletics (track and field)
Olympic silver medalists in athletics (track and field)
Commonwealth Games medallists in athletics
Commonwealth Games gold medallists for Jamaica
Olympic female sprinters
Athletes (track and field) at the 2019 Pan American Games
Pan American Games gold medalists for Jamaica
Pan American Games medalists in athletics (track and field)
Diamond League winners
Pan American Games gold medalists in athletics (track and field)
World Athletics Championships winners
Medalists at the 2019 Pan American Games
Athletes (track and field) at the 2020 Summer Olympics
Medalists at the 2020 Summer Olympics
Athletes (track and field) at the 2022 Commonwealth Games
Medallists at the 2022 Commonwealth Games